Lepidolutzia is a monotypic moth genus in the family Erebidae described by Rego Barros in 1956. Its only species, Lepidolutzia baucis, was first described by Johan Wilhelm Dalman in 1823. It is found on Cuba, Bolivia and the Brazilian state of Pará.

References

External links

Phaegopterina
Monotypic moth genera
Moths described in 1823
Moths of the Caribbean
Moths of South America